Antonio Samorè (4 December 1905 – 3 February 1983) was an Italian Cardinal  of the Catholic Church. He was elevated to the cardinalate in 1967.

Biography

Samorè was born in Bardi, near Parma. After studying at the seminary in Piacenza and the Pontifical Lateran University in Rome, he was ordained to the priesthood by Bishop Ersilio Menzani on 10 June 1928. Samorè then did pastoral work in Piacenza until 1932, when he became attaché and secretary of the Lithuanian nunciature. He was raised to the rank of Privy Chamberlain of His Holiness on 28 February 1935, and later a Domestic Prelate of His Holiness on 27 February 1947. In 1938, Samorè was named secretary of the nunciature to Switzerland and also entered the Roman Curia as an official of the Secretariat of State. He was then counselor of the apostolic delegation to the United States from 1947 to 1950.

On 30 January 1950, Samorè was appointed Apostolic Nuncio to Colombia and Titular Archbishop of Ternobus by Pope Pius XII. He received his episcopal consecration on the following 16 April from Clemente Micara, with Archbishop Filippo Bernardini and Bishop Alberto Carinci serving as co-consecrators, in the church of Santa Maria sopra Minerva. Samorè later returned to Rome upon his naming as Secretary of the Congregation for Extraordinary Ecclesiastical Affairs on 7 February 1953. As Secretary, he was the second-highest official of that dicastery. Before and after the Second Vatican Council (1962–1965), later as President of the Pontifical Commission for Latin America, he was charged by Pope Paul VI to stem support of liberation theology and "ecclesial base communities" by the Latin American Episcopal Conference (CELAM). Samorè was one of the few people made privy to the third part of the Secret of Fátima by Pope St. John XXIII.

He was created Cardinal-Priest of Santa Maria sopra Minerva by Paul VI in the consistory of 26 June 1967. A protégé of Alfredo Ottaviani, the heavily conservative Samorè advised Pope Paul against granting his approval to artificial birth control. The next year, on 1 November 1968, Paul appointed him Prefect of the Congregation for the Discipline of the Sacraments. Following the death of Giovanni Urbani in 1969, Cardinal Samorè was one of the leading contenders to succeed him as Patriarch of Venice; the position went to Bishop Albino Luciani. Samorè, upon resigning as Prefect on 25 January 1974, was named Archivist and Librarian of the Holy Roman Church. On 12 December of that same year, he became Cardinal Bishop of Sabina-Poggio Mirteto.

From 1978 to 1983, he acted as a special representative of Pope John Paul II, earning Samorè the nickname "the Vatican Kissinger", for mediating the dispute between Chile and Argentina, which were on the brink of war because of a disagreement concerning the ownership of the strategic Picton, Lennox and Nueva islands during the Beagle conflict. The international pass of Puyehue that links Osorno in Chile with Bariloche (Argentina) was later renamed Cardenal Antonio Samorè Pass.

Samorè died of a heart attack in Rome, at age 77. He is buried in the church of the Carmelite monastery of Vetralla.

References

Additional sources

External links

SAMORÈ, Antonio

1905 births
1983 deaths
Clergy from the Province of Parma
Apostolic Nuncios to Colombia
Beagle conflict
20th-century Italian cardinals
Cardinal-bishops of Sabina
Participants in the Second Vatican Council
Members of the Congregation for Divine Worship and the Discipline of the Sacraments
Members of the Congregation for the Discipline of the Sacraments
Pontifical Commission for Latin America
Cardinals created by Pope Paul VI
Grand Crosses 1st class of the Order of Merit of the Federal Republic of Germany